"The Dreamtime Duck of the Never Never" is a 1993 Scrooge McDuck comic by Don Rosa. It is the seventh of the original 12 chapters in the series The Life and Times of Scrooge McDuck. The story takes place from 1893 to 1896.

The story was first published in the Danish Anders And & Co. #1993-24; the first American publication was in Uncle Scrooge #291, in April 1995.

Story
In the McDuck Clan ancestral castle in Scotland, Scrooge's father and uncle speak of Scrooge and his accomplishments, toasting to "the lad". Meanwhile, Scrooge has gone to Kalgoorlie, Australia, after hearing of gold being found there. In the middle of the desert, he rescues an aborigine wiseman, Jabiru Kapirigi, from being robbed by a highwayman.

Jabiru, or Jabby as Scrooge calls him, tells Scrooge that he is on a walkabout, reading the Dreamtime tale, and he wants Scrooge to join him. Scrooge, hoping to find gold where Jabby leads him, goes along. As the wiseman hands Scrooge a didgeridoo, Scrooge sarcastically replies "Great! Now I'm John Philip Sousa!", which Jabby takes literally, and hence, calls Scrooge by the name Jonflip Zooza.

Whilst blowing the didgeridoo, the sand beneath Scrooge crumbles to reveal an ancient cave. The two use a rope to climb down into the hole, where on the walls the Dreamtale is written. Jabby reads it aloud to Scrooge:

"It tells of Kakadu the dingo, he steals the crocodile egg from its nest!
But the great platypus chases Kakadu...
...and Irria, the black cockatoo, sends Bunyip, the water monster, after the egg thief!
Bunyip chases the dingo...
...and the great platypus finds the sacred egg, but loses his firstborn in the fight!

Scrooge dismisses it all as "pure humbug", and asks Jabby if the cave holds any gold. There is none, but Jabby points to a giant opal. Scrooge wishes to buy it, but their rope is being hauled up by the highwayman. Having heard of the opal, he orders them to send it up, and he will let them climb out. When he has the opal, however, he just throws the rope down. He then steals Scrooge's camel and all his things. 

To get out, Scrooge blows Jabby's didgeridoo to summon an emu, then uses the emu to chase after the highwayman. When he rides off, Jabby asks Scrooge if he will return the opal, but Scrooge gives no answer. Come morning, the highwayman is searching through Scrooge's belongings and finds some coins. One, tied to a string that "isn't even Aussie", is Scrooge's number one dime. He throws the coins away just as Scrooge catches up with him, and ties a rope around the thief. As they turn around, the coins, including the one dime, lie in the sand, forgotten.

They ride for some time, before a kangaroo stampede passes by them. The camel then runs off with the highwayman, but Scrooge falls off. He hears a roar in the distant and, looking in his spyglass, sees that it's a flash flood from the mountains. He runs for shelter, and just barely makes it to the Dreamtale cave, which is then sealed off by the water and wet sand. Come morning he can again leave, climbing out on the wet sand. He ponders taking the giant opal for himself, as no one will know for a hundred years, but decides that he wants to make his fortune by right means, and leaves the opal behind.

Much later, at the edge of the desert, Scrooge encounters Jabby again, sitting by a campfire at the end of another Dreamtale cave. Jabby knows that Scrooge returned the opal, and when Scrooge tells him that he had lost his number one dime, Jabby wonders if it was like his firstborn. It is, and Scrooge realises that he in fact is the great platypus from the Dreamtale. Scrooge realizes that the part of the Dreamtale that Jabby read him earlier actually foretold his adventure with the highwayman and the flash flood.

Jabby continues to tell Scrooge that the great platypus's firstborn was saved by Djuway, the bowerbird who builds his nest with shiny trinkets. Nearby is a bowerbird nest, and looking inside Scrooge finds his number one dime. Ecstatic, he wonders what else the Dreamtale says about the great platypus. As a reward for returning the egg (the opal), Scrooge is allowed to "see his dream through the crystal eye". Jabby casts sunlight upon a crystal of his, held by Scrooge against the wall of the cave. What Scrooge sees resembles the northern lights, and it tells him to go north of the Rocky Mountains, north to the Yukon.

As Scrooge leaves, singing happily to himself, Jabby looks at the Dreamtale, where there is a drawing resembling his money bin, and his nephews, Donald, Huey, Dewey and Louie. Jabby finds it confusing, and wonders what they have "to do with a poor, out of luck fossicker (prospector) like poor Jonflip".

Themes and conception 
In his author's note to the story, Don Rosa wrote that one of the characteristics that distinguish Scrooge from his nephew, Donald Duck, is the former's interest in archaeology and respect for the importance of history.  Rosa wanted to write an "origin story" for this aspect of Scrooge's character, and while doing so, realized that the Aboriginal Australians have "probably a greater sense of their historical continuity than anyone else in the world."
When Jabiru first shows Scrooge the cave and adds his hand print to the many others counting previous visitors, Scrooge does some calculation and is floored to realize that the aborigines have been continuously visiting the cave for over 20,000 years.
After Scrooge recovers his Number One Dime, Jabiru reminds him that wisdom and riches can always be found in "the search for the past", and Scrooge declares himself firmly convinced.

External links

Dreamtime Duck of the Never Never on Duckman
The Life and Times of $crooge McDuck - Episode 7

Disney comics stories
Donald Duck comics by Don Rosa
Fiction set in 1893
Fiction set in 1894
Fiction set in 1895
Fiction set in 1896
1993 in comics
Comics set in the 19th century
Comics set in Scotland
Comics set in Australia
Works set in castles
The Life and Times of Scrooge McDuck